The Girl in the Park is a 2007 drama film, the first directed by David Auburn, screenwriter of Proof (2005) and The Lake House (2006). It stars Sigourney Weaver, Kate Bosworth and Keri Russell.

Plot
Since the disappearance of her three-year-old daughter 16 years ago, Julia (Weaver) has cut herself off from everyone, including her husband and son. But when she meets Louise (Bosworth), a troubled young woman with a checkered past, all of Julia's old psychological wounds resurface, manifested as an irrational hope that Louise may be her lost daughter.

Cast
Sigourney Weaver as Julia Sandburg
Kate Bosworth as Louise
Alessandro Nivola as Chris
Keri Russell as Celeste
David Rasche as Doug
Elias Koteas as Raymond

Filming
Filming began in New York City on November 13, 2006, and was scheduled to end on December 21, 2006. The film was premiered at the Toronto International Film Festival on September 9, 2007.

Reception
On review aggregator Rotten Tomatoes, the film holds an approval rating of 71% based on 14 reviews, with an average rating of 5.68/10. The website's critics consensus reads: "Sigourney Weaver delivers a towering performance in this poignant meditation on unresolved grief." Jason Solomons of the Guardian "likes this deceptive drama, its tensions and releases, its symbolic use of Scrabble to denote cohesion and confusion and its dark fears of parenting, children, ageing, loss and connection."

References

External links
 
 

2007 films
2007 drama films
American drama films
Films scored by Theodore Shapiro
2007 directorial debut films
2000s English-language films
2000s American films